Shane Robertson (born 27 December 1963) is a former Australian rules footballer who played for Carlton in the VFL.

Shane Robertson in 1980 coach St Domonics U/10's in Broadmeadows at the age of 16. 

They went through the Home & Away season undefeated and went on to win the premiership.

Robertson was a midfielder and flanker, winning a premiership with Carlton in 1987.

References

External links

 

1963 births
Living people
Australian rules footballers from Victoria (Australia)
Carlton Football Club players
Carlton Football Club Premiership players
One-time VFL/AFL Premiership players